This page lists all described species of the spider family Paratropididae accepted by the World Spider Catalog :

Anisaspis

Anisaspis Simon, 1892
 A. camarita Perafán, Galvis & Pérez-Miles, 2019 — Colombia
 A. tuberculata Simon, 1892 (type) — St. Vincent

Anisaspoides

Anisaspoides F. O. Pickard-Cambridge, 1896
 A. gigantea F. O. Pickard-Cambridge, 1896 (type) — Brazil

Paratropis

Paratropis Simon, 1889
 Paratropis elicioi Dupérré, 2015 — Ecuador
 Paratropis florezi Perafán, Galvis & Pérez-Miles, 2019 — Colombia
 Paratropis minuscula (Almeida & de Morais, 2022) — Guyana
 Paratropis otonga Dupérré & Tapia, 2020 — Ecuador
 Paratropis papilligera F. O. Pickard-Cambridge, 1896 — Colombia, Brazil
 Paratropis pristirana Dupérré & Tapia, 2020 — Ecuador
 Paratropis sanguinea Mello-Leitão, 1923 — Brazil
 Paratropis scruposa Simon, 1889 (type) — Peru
 Paratropis seminermis Caporiacco, 1955 — Venezuela
 Paratropis tuxtlensis Valdez-Mondragón, Mendoza & Francke, 2014 — Mexico

Stormtropis

Stormtropis Perafán, Galvis & Pérez-Miles, 2019
 S. colima Perafán, Galvis & Pérez-Miles, 2019 — Colombia
 S. muisca Perafán, Galvis & Pérez-Miles, 2019 — Colombia
 S. paisa Perafán, Galvis & Pérez-Miles, 2019 — Colombia
 S. parvum Perafán, Galvis & Pérez-Miles, 2019 (type) — Colombia

References

Paratropididae